Cyberchrist is the seventh album by heavy metal band Vicious Rumors, released in 1998.

Track listing
"Cyberchrist" - 4:26
"Buried Alive" - 5:05
"Kill the Day" - 4:23
"No Apologies" - 3:29
"Fear of God" - 3:56
"Gigs Eviction" - 3:13
"Barcelona" - 3:07
"Downpour" - 3:07
"Candles Burn" - 5:09
"Fiend" - 2:51
"Faith" - 5:12
"Thorne" - 3:50

Personnel
 Geoff Thorpe: Guitars
 Steve Smyth: Guitars
 Brian O'Connor: Vocals
 Tommy Sisco: Bass
 Larry Howe: Drums

1998 albums
Vicious Rumors albums